Make Me a Supermodel may refer to:
Make Me a Supermodel (British TV series), the original British version aired on Five
Make Me a Supermodel (American TV series), the American version on Bravo (US TV channel) 
Make Me a Supermodel (season 1)
Make Me a Supermodel (season 2)
Make Me a Supermodel (Australian TV series), the Australian version on the Seven Network